Šišava (Serbian Cyrillic: Шишава) is a village located on the slopes of Vlašić Mountain, central Bosnia, in the Travnik Municipality of the Federation of Bosnia and Herzegovina.

Population 

Central Bosnia Canton
Villages in Bosnia and Herzegovina